Futbol Club Vilafranca is a Spanish football team based in Vilafranca del Penedès, Catalonia. Founded in 1904, it currently plays in Tercera División RFEF – Group 5, holding home matches at Camp Municipal with a capacity for 5,000 seats.

History
The club was founded in 1904, being one of the oldest football clubs in Spain. In August 2020, the club became the farm team of Lleida Esportiu.

In May 2021, Vilafranca achieved a first-ever promotion to Segunda División RFEF (which replaced the old Segunda División B), but as Lleida failed to achieve promotion to Primera División RFEF, Vilafranca became ineligible for promotion.

Season to season

30 seasons in Tercera División
1 season in Tercera División RFEF

Notes

References

External links
Official website 
Futbolme team profile 

Football clubs in Catalonia
Association football clubs established in 1904
1904 establishments in Spain
Lleida Esportiu
Spanish reserve football teams